

Fixtures and Results

2022

The Mongolia national under-23 football team is a youth football team operated under the auspices of Mongolian Football Federation. Its primary role is qualification into and competition at the quadriennial Olympic Football Tournament. Shuichi Mase is the team's head coach as of April 2021.

Coaching staff

Managers

Competitive history

AFC U-23 Championship

Source(s):

Olympic Games

Asian Games

See also
 Mongolia women's national football team

References

External links
MFF Official website

u23
Asian national under-23 association football teams